Victor Allan Riley (born November 4, 1974) is a former American football player who played offensive tackle. Riley played college football for Auburn University. He was drafted in the first round of the 1998 NFL Draft by the Kansas City Chiefs, with whom he played for four seasons. He was the No. 7 offensive tackle available in the draft, according to Sports Illustrated. He also played for three seasons with the New Orleans Saints before signing in 2005 with the Houston Texans.

References

1974 births
Living people
People from Lexington County, South Carolina
American football offensive tackles
Auburn Tigers football players
Kansas City Chiefs players
New Orleans Saints players
Houston Texans players